Extraterrestrial liquid water in the Solar System is likely uncommon, although it has been hypothesized to exist in some of its moons, and to have formerly existed on Mars and Venus. Extrasolar liquid water has not yet been confirmed to exist. The following list contains candidates that meet the following criteria:

 Confirmed object of Earth mass or greater orbiting within a circumstellar habitable zone (CHZ)
 May not be a star
 Has been studied for more than a year
 Confirmed surface with strong evidence for it being either solid or liquid
 Water vapour detected in its atmosphere
 Gravitational, radio or differentation models predict a wet stratum

Most known extrasolar planetary systems appear to have very different compositions from the Solar System, though there is sampling bias arising from the detection methods.

The goal of current searches is to find Earth-sized planets in the habitable zone of their planetary systems (also called the Goldilocks zone). Planets with oceans could include Earth-sized moons of giant planets, though it remains speculative whether such 'moons' really exist. The Kepler telescope might be sensitive enough to detect them. But there is evidence that rocky planets hosting water may be commonplace throughout the Milky Way.

In June 2020, NASA scientists reported that it is likely that exoplanets with oceans may be common in the Milky Way galaxy, based on mathematical modeling studies.

Planets

Planetary systems

Description (alphabetical order)

Gliese 581 c, d and g 
Later work suggests that Gliese 581 c would probably be too hot for liquid water. It was then suggested that Gliese 581 d might be warm enough for oceans if a greenhouse effect was operating. Gliese 581 d is eight times the mass of the Earth and might have a thick atmosphere.

Gliese 581 d looks an even better candidate. The orbital period was originally estimated at 83 days and has now been revised to 66 days. This was announced along with another new world, Gliese 581 e, which is next to twice the mass of Earth but too close to its sun for liquid water. In May 2011, a new study suggested that the planet might have a thick atmosphere, oceans and even life.

The unconfirmed planet Gliese 581 g is another good candidate. This planet is estimated to be between three and four times as massive as the earth, and as such it is too small to be a gas giant. The orbital period is estimated at 37 days, which places its orbit right in the middle of the habitable zone of the star Gliese 581.

Gliese 667 C - three planets 

Gliese 667 Cc was originally described as one of two 'super-Earth' planets around Gliese 667 C, a dim red star that is part of a triple star system.  The stars of this system have a concentration of heavy elements only 25% that of our Sun's.  Such elements are the building blocks of terrestrial planets so it was thought to be unusual for such star systems to have an abundance of low mass planets.  It seems that habitable planets can form in a greater variety of environments than previously believed.

Gliese 667 Cc, in a tight 28-day orbit of a dim red star, must receive 90% of the light that Earth receives, but most of its incoming light is in the infrared, so a higher percentage of this incoming energy should be absorbed by the planet. The planet is expected to absorb about the same amount of energy from its star that Earth absorbs from the Sun, which would allow surface temperatures similar to Earth and perhaps liquid water.

Further work published in June 2013 suggests that the system has six planets, and that three of them are in the habitable zone.

HD 28185 b 
HD 28185 b was the first exoplanet to be detected in the habitable zone. The planet has only been detected indirectly, but is believed to be a gas giant, with no solid surface. Some scientists have argued that it could have moons large and stable enough to have oceans.

HD 85512 b 
HD 85512 b was discovered in August 2011. It is larger than Earth, but small enough to be probably a rocky world. It is on the borders of its star's habitable zone and might have liquid water, and is a potential candidate for a life-supporting world.

MOA-2007-BLG-192Lb 
MOA-2007-BLG-192Lb is a small planet orbiting a small star. It is about 3 Earth masses, currently the second smallest detected extrasolar planet orbiting a normal star, after Gliese 581 e.

The planet orbits its host star or brown dwarf with an orbital radius similar to that of Venus. But the host is likely to be between 3,000 and 1 million times fainter than the Sun, so the top of the planet's atmosphere is likely to be colder than Pluto. However, the planet is likely to maintain a massive atmosphere that would allow warmer temperatures at lower altitudes. It is even possible that interior heating by radioactive decay would be sufficient to make the surface as warm as the Earth, but theory suggests that the surface may be completely covered by a very deep ocean.

Kapteyn b 
Kapteyn b is a super-Earth orbiting within the habitable zone of Kapteyn's Star, which is 13 light-years away and is 11 billion years old.
 However, evidence in 2021 ruled out the existence of this planet.

Kepler-62e and Kepler-62f 
The star Kepler-62 has five planets, two of which are the right distance from the star to have liquid water and potentially sustain life.

Kepler-62f is only 40 percent larger than Earth, making it the exoplanet closest to the size of Earth known in the habitable zone of another star.  Kepler-62e orbits on the inner edge of the habitable zone and is roughly 60 percent larger than Earth. Both are assumed to be rocky planets, but since the star is 1200 light-years away, it's hard to be sure.

Kepler-69c 
This large rocky planet is one of two known to be orbiting the star Kepler 69, which is similar to the Sun. It's believed to be in the star's habitable zone.

It's 70% more massive than the Earth and has a 242-day orbit, similar to that of Venus.

NASA announced its discovery on 18 April 2013, along with the two Earth-like planets of Kepler 62.

Kepler (other results) 
Among the 1,235 possible extrasolar planet candidates detected by NASA's planet-hunting Kepler space telescope during its first four months of operation, 54 are orbiting in the parent star's habitable 'Goldilocks' zone where liquid water could exist. Five of these are near Earth-size, and the remaining 49 habitable zone candidates range from twice the size of Earth to larger than Jupiter.

Proxima b 
Proxima Centauri b, the nearest known exoplanet, is in the habitable zone of its host star, and might contain liquid water.

 More details about the planet's physical conditions are needed for a proper evaluation of its habitability.

TOI-1452 b  
In August 2022, water was detected on the exoplanet TOI-1452 b based on studies with data from the Transiting Exoplanet Survey Satellite (TESS).

TRAPPIST-1 - four planets 
In February 2017, seven planets were discovered in the star system TRAPPIST-1, previously unknown to host any planets. Four of the discovered planets, called TRAPPIST-1d, TRAPPIST-1e, TRAPPIST-1f and TRAPPIST-1g, are candidates for liquid water. They are all located towards the outer system (with the closest to the star, TRAPPIST-1d, being within or slightly outside the inner edge of the habitable zone), making them cool planets. TRAPPIST-1e and f are probably tidally locked planets, and if liquid water exists in them, it is located in their respective terminator lines. However, if the planets support a thick enough atmosphere to transfer heat to the sides facing away from the star, much larger portions of them may be habitable.

WASP-96b 
In July 2022, water was detected on the exoplanet WASP-96b based on spectrum studies with the James Webb Space Telescope.

See also 
 Lists of exoplanets
 List of potentially habitable exoplanets
 Ocean world

Notes

References

 
Candidates for liquid water